Wheat Ridge High School is a public secondary school operated by the Jefferson County School District R-1 in Wheat Ridge, Colorado, United States.

Extracurricular activities

Athletics
State championship titles:
Baseball: 1992 (5A)
Boys' ice hockey: 2002, 2006, 2007(5A)
Girls' ice hockey: 2007, 2008, 2009
Boys' basketball: 1944 (B), 1953 (A), 1963 (AAA), 1968 (AAA), 1991 (5A)
Girls' basketball: 1977 (AAA), 1982 (4A)
Boys' cross country: 1977 (I), 1979, 1981, (I)2007
Girls' cross country: 1981 (I)
Football: 1966 (AAA), 1967 (AAA), 1973 (AAA), 1994 (4A), 1996 (4A), 2006 (4A), 2008 (4A), 2010 (4A)
Girls' golf: 1991 (team); Amy Root, 1991 (individual)
Girls' gymnastics: 1985 (III)
Softball: 2002 (5A), 2003 (5A), 2008 (4A), 2009 (4A), 2013 (4A)
Girls' soccer: 2009, 2010
Girls' swimming: 1987 (5A), 1988 (5A)
Boys' tennis: 1991 (6A)
Boys' track and field: 1942 (B), 1944 (B), 1945 (B), 1946 (B), 1950 (B), 1978 (AAA)
Girls' track and field: 1978 (AAA)
Girls' volleyball: 1987 (4A), 1990 (5A)
 Marching band:  1993 (4A), 1996
 Winter Percussion: 2013 (PSA), 2016 (PSCA), 2017 (PSCA), 2018(PSCA)

Notable alumni

 Annaleigh Ashford, Broadway actress
 Jeff Fosnes, Vanderbilt University basketball player (1972–1976), Golden State Warriors draft pick (1976), two-time NCAA Academic All-American, and Sunkist High School All-American
 Pat Frink, NBA player (Cincinnati Royals)
 Tim Gill, co-founder of Quark, Inc.; LGBT rights activist
 Ray Johnson, football player
 Terry Kunz, NFL player
 Shayla LaVeaux, adult film actress
 Dave Logan, NFL player; football coach, radio and television host
 Nathan Marquardt, professional mixed martial arts fighter, formerly competing in the UFC
 Dean Reed, actor, director, singer, and songwriter
 Freddie Steinmark, starting safety on Texas' 1969 national championship team; author of I Play to Win, published after he lost his battle to cancer in 1971
 Don Styron, hurdler, still current world record holder in the now defunct 200 meter low hurdle race, set in 1960

See also
Jefferson County School District R-1

References

External links 
 

Public high schools in Colorado
Educational institutions established in 1886
Jefferson County Public Schools (Colorado)
Wheat Ridge, Colorado
Schools in Jefferson County, Colorado
1886 establishments in Colorado